Ted Purves (1964 – July 4, 2017)  was an American artist, educator, and independent curator living in Oakland, California. He was the chair of the first Social Practice graduate program in the US, at the California College of the Arts in San Francisco, California. Central to Purves' interests were the gift economy, and the distribution of free goods and services by artists.

Publications
Purves edited What We Want Is Free: Generosity and Exchange in Recent Art, published by SUNY Press in 2005. It includes essays by curators   Bill Arning, Kate Fowle and Lars Bang Larsen, Mary Jane Jacob and artists Ben Kinmont, Jörgen Svensson, Guy Overfelt, Jeanne van Heeswijk, and an interview with Cesare Pietroiusi by Shane Aslan Selzer. It also includes a Projects Histories section with short descriptions of dozens of related projects.

The Momentary Academy
The Momentary Academy was a temporary school realized at the Yerba Buena Center for the Arts, during the Bay Area Now 4 exhibition. It offered free classes to the public led by artists in the exhibition. Classes involved practical as well as experimental subjects, and ranged from single workshop sessions to weekly meetings.

Classes offered included Marco Polo's Favorite Potstickers: A Cross Cultural Cooking Lesson by Edie Tsong; The Lost & Found Society by Joseph del Pesco and Alex Burke; The Power of Breath by Helena Keeffe; Changing Patterns: Contemporary Clothing Construction and Design Innovation by Scatha G Allison; Paper Parlour by Christine Shields; Paper, 8.5" x 11", White. by Tommy Becker; The Medium is the Message by Josh Greene; Mindscapes by Fred Loomis; Spoken Word Spoken by Chris Kubick; Sacred Geometry by Ezra Li Eismont; and finally Perfect Models: Inventing Schools as Works of Art by Ted Purves with special guest Jon Rubin.

Temescal Amity Works
Temescal Amity Works is a public project in Oakland, California involving the free distribution of locally grown fruit, and the exchange of information and services in a neighborhood diverse in race and class that is in the process of redefining itself amidst the pressures of gentrification and development.

References

External links
 AmityWorks Project information
 Social Practice at CCA.edu
 Ted Purves at CCA.edu
 What We Want is Free
 Creative Capital - Amity Works Page
 Shadow Cabinets in a Bright Country (at Apex Art (art space), NY)
Ted Purves' Interview with Bad At Sports

1964 births
American art curators
American contemporary artists
Artists from the San Francisco Bay Area
2017 deaths